Slifer House, also known as Administration Building-Evangelical Home, is a historic home located at Kelly Township, Union County, Pennsylvania.  It was designed by noted Philadelphia architect Samuel Sloan and built in 1861, as a country home for Lewisburg merchant Eli Slifer (1818-1888).  It has a -story, brick, square main section, with two rectangular rear wings.  The main section has a hipped roof with cross gables in a Victorian style.  It features wraparound and two-story porches and a four-story square tower. It has housed elder care facilities since 1916, when it was purchased by the Evangelical Association.

It was listed on the National Register of Historic Places in 1975.

The house is now owned by Albright Care Services and opened as a Victorian-era historic house museum. It includes artifacts from its use over the years as a home for seniors, orphanage and community hospital.

References

External links
 Slifer House Museum - official site

Houses on the National Register of Historic Places in Pennsylvania
Houses completed in 1861
Houses in Union County, Pennsylvania
1861 establishments in Pennsylvania
National Register of Historic Places in Union County, Pennsylvania
Museums in Union County, Pennsylvania
Historic house museums in Pennsylvania